Winnersh Triangle railway station is one of two railway stations in Winnersh, Berkshire, England.

History
British Rail opened the station on 12 May 1986 to serve housing developments at Lower Earley, Woodley and Winnersh, as well as the Winnersh Triangle business park which had been developed to the north. Constructed at a cost of £375,000, the housing developers contributed 20% while the remainder was met by Berkshire County Council and British Rail.

Over the years, the business park has evolved from a mixed office and warehousing form to a more dense office park, including several hotels. At the beginning of the 2010s, a new landscaped bridge was constructed between the front of the station and the business park, avoiding the need for travellers to cross the busy intermediate road. In 2015, a new park and ride site was opened outside the front of the station, the result of the relocation of a site at nearby Loddon Bridge that was found to be prone to flooding.

Facilities
The station has two side platforms, which are long enough for an eight-car train. These are built of timber, the lightweight construction being to reduce the load on the railway embankment across the Loddon Valley. The station building is brick-built and situated at ground level, to the north of the embankment and platforms, with direct pedestrian access to the Winnersh Triangle business park via the landscaped bridge. A secondary entrance to the station is available on the south side, connecting to a footpath to the Wokingham Road and nearby residential roads; both this and the access to the southern platform make use of a pre-existing arch under the railway.

The station building includes a ticket office, but it is currently staffed only on Monday to Saturday mornings. On Sundays the station is open but the booking office is closed. There is also a self-service ticket machine outside the station building. There is no disabled access to the platforms, and all access between the station entrances and the platforms is by stairs.

The station is situated near to a junction of the A329(M) motorway, providing convenient access from places along that motorway and the M4 motorway, which the A329M intersects  to the east. Outside the main entrance to the station is the park and ride site, which is served by express buses (№ 500) running every 15 minutes into central Reading, in addition to the trains at the station. The car park has capacity for 390 cars, and has a current usage of 70% bus and 20% rail park and ride users.  walk to the south of the station, on Wokingham Road, are stops on the 4 and X4 local bus route that links Reading, Wokingham and Bracknell.

Services
The station is served by two Waterloo to Reading line trains per hour in each direction off-peak (including Sundays), and up to four trains per hour in peak hours. All North Downs line trains, which share tracks with the Reading to Waterloo line trains between Wokingham and Reading, currently pass through the station without stopping.

Future
A new development for the station environment, known as Winnersh Triangle Parkway, has been proposed by Wokingham Borough Council. This will involve the addition of a parking deck over the existing Park and Ride car park that will add an extra 130 parking spaces, a revamp of the ticket office and waiting areas inside the station building, and improvements to pedestrian access in the station forecourt area. Work commenced on the development in April 2021, with completion expected by Spring 2022.

References

Bibliography

External links
 

Railway stations in Berkshire
DfT Category E stations
Railway stations opened by British Rail
Railway stations in Great Britain opened in 1986
Railway stations served by South Western Railway
Borough of Wokingham